The Curti Valmarana is a Renaissance-style palace in located on the Grand Canal, between the Palazzo Querini Benzon and the Palazzo Corner Spinelli in the sestiere of San Marco of Venice, Italy. It stands across the canal from the  Palazzo Querini Dubois.

References

Houses completed in the 16th century
Curti Valmarana
Curti Valmarana
Renaissance architecture in Venice